Ards Lower (named after the former barony of Ards), alternatively known as North Ards, is a barony in County Down, Northern Ireland. It lies on the northern half of the Ards Peninsula in the north-east of the county, with the Irish Sea to its east and Strangford Lough to its south-west. It is bordered by two other baronies: Ards Upper to the south; and Castlereagh Lower to the west.

The barony of Ards Lower was created in 1851 when the barony of Ards was split into two, the other part being Ards Upper.

List of settlements
Below is a list of settlements in Ards Lower:

Towns
Bangor (also partly in barony of Castlereagh Lower)
Donaghadee
Newtownards (also partly in barony of Castlereagh Lower)

Villages
Carrowdore
Conlig
Greyabbey
Groomsport
Millisle

Population centres
Clandeboye (split with the barony of Castlereagh Lower)
Kilcooley

List of civil parishes
Below is a list of civil parishes in Ards Lower:
Bangor (also partly in barony of Castlereagh Lower)
Donaghadee
Greyabbey
Newtownards (also partly in barony of Castlereagh Lower)

References

 
Clandeboye